Edumudi is a village in Prakasam district of the Indian state of Andhra Pradesh. It is located in Naguluppalapadu mandal of Tenali revenue division.

References

Villages in Prakasam district